Wayleggo is a 1965 New Zealand short film.
It was produced by the National Film Unit.
The film was based on the 1947 musterer memoir Wayleggo written by Peter Newton.

Synopsis
Showing the working life of a young musterer on a 145,000 acre South Island merino sheep station. Beginning in the summer with dog training and horse breaking, then the autumn mustering of 10,000 sheep from the tops, across rivers and down to the yards before winter snows.

Production
This was a short colour film production released by the National Film Unit.

Reviews
1965 The Press -“Wayleggo,” A High Country Film.
1966 The Press - High-country film coming.
1966 The Press - Melbourne Prize High Country Documentary.
1995 featured in New Zealand's contribution to the British Film Institute's Century of Cinema series - Cinema of Unease: A Personal Journey by Sam Neill.

References

1965 films
1960s New Zealand films
1960s English-language films
National Film Unit
1960s short films
1965 in New Zealand
Films set in New Zealand
New Zealand short films